Jasem Mohammed Ibrahim Al Huwaidi (born 28 October 1972 in Kuwait City) is a retired Kuwaiti footballer who played as a forward.

Career 
He was part of the Kuwaiti national football team that came 24th in the FIFA ranking. He got a silver medal in the Asian Games, won two Gulf Cups and came third in the Arab Cup. Al Houwaidi was the world's top scorer award in 1998.

He competed for Kuwait at the 1992 Summer Olympics in Barcelona.

International goals 
Results list Kuwait's goal tally first.

Individual
IFFHS World's Top Goal Scorer: 1998

References

External links

1972 births
Living people
Sportspeople from Kuwait City
Kuwaiti footballers
Association football forwards
Al Salmiya SC players
Al Shabab Al Arabi Club Dubai players
Al Hilal SFC players
Al-Rayyan SC players
Kuwait Premier League players
Saudi Professional League players
Qatar Stars League players
UAE Pro League players
Olympic footballers of Kuwait
Kuwait international footballers
Footballers at the 1992 Summer Olympics
1996 AFC Asian Cup players
Footballers at the 1998 Asian Games
2000 AFC Asian Cup players
Asian Games medalists in football
Asian Games silver medalists for Kuwait
Medalists at the 1998 Asian Games
Kuwaiti expatriate footballers
Kuwaiti expatriate sportspeople in Saudi Arabia
Kuwaiti expatriate sportspeople in Qatar
Kuwaiti expatriate sportspeople in the United Arab Emirates
Expatriate footballers in Saudi Arabia
Expatriate footballers in Qatar
Expatriate footballers in the United Arab Emirates